Oxford University Lightweight Rowing Club (OULRC) is the university rowing club for lightweight men at the University of Oxford which selects crews to race against Cambridge University Boat Club in the Lightweight Boat Races at the end of Hilary term. These races are usually held in late March each year.

Membership and racing

Membership of OULRC is by competitive selection drawn solely from student members of the university. OULRC commences the selection process in September prior to the beginning of Michaelmas term, recruiting from both undergraduate and postgraduate members of the University. By the end of Michaelmas, the squad is reduced to two trial eights which compete in a Trial Eights race in London over the course used for the race against Cambridge. From this squad the club selects a first crew, known as the Lightweight Blue Boat, and a reserve crew, known as Nephthys.

The Blue Boat goes on to race Cambridge. From 2000 until 2006 Nephthys also raced against a lightweight reserve crew from Cambridge, Granta. Since 2007, however, Cambridge has declined to field a Granta crew, and Nephthys has raced in the Head of the River Race and other external races. The squad also participates in BUCS championships.

Nephthys derives its name from the Egyptian goddess of the same name who was claimed to be the sister of Isis. Isis is the name given to the heavyweight reserve crew, and is also the term used within the university for  the reach of the Thames between Osney lock and Iffley lock on which the college crews row. Although the Blue Boat does not compete in regattas after racing against Cambridge, OULRC does occasionally field crews in the Henley Royal Regatta, which often compete as Nephthys.

The Blue Boat crew have the right to wear a distinctive uniform. This includes a cream cable sweater with two blue stripes around the neck and the club insignia embroidered in the centre of the chest. As a full blue sport, they also wear an Oxford blue blazer with the club insignia on the chest pocket. Previously a half-blue sport, this replaced a blue and white striped blazer with OULRC embroidery or a blue blazer with white piping and embroidery worn in the early years of the club. Nephthys members wear a white blazer with blue piping, with crossed blades and the word Nephthys on the chest pocket.

Organisation and history

The first Lightweight Boat Race was in 1975, and the first lightweight crew originally raced under the auspices of Oxford University Boat Club. OULRC was formed soon after. The management of the club is in the hands of an elected committee composed of students, although the day-to-day running is mainly in the hands of the president, who is elected by Blue Boat and Nephthys members each year. Like all Oxford University clubs, it also has a senior member, who is a university don.

Along with OUBC, OUWBC, and OUWLRC, OULRC is part of Oxford University Rowing Clubs which is the body that oversees all college rowing in Oxford.

1987 mutiny

In 1987, at the time of the OUBC Mutiny, a similar dispute also arose in relation to the selection of the Lightweight Blue Boat. This dispute threatened the running of the 1987 race. The President, David Whittaker, who rowed the previous year, had lost a selection race against another rower, Sean Sinclair. As president, Whittaker claimed the right to select the crew against the recommendations of the coach, and former OUBC Blue, Rob Clay. The crew, in turn, refused to row with Whittaker in the boat. The matter was finally resolved when an extraordinary meeting was called and life members from London travelled up to Oxford to elect Bob Macdonald as president. Ironically, one of the American OUBC mutineers, Dan Lyons, was called in to assist in coaching the 1987 crew after the original coach, Rob Clay, was called out of retirement to stroke Isis.

Facilities and training

For much of its history, OULRC trained outside of Oxford, variously at Radley (downstream) and at Godstow (upstream). Since 2007 OULRC has been based at the Fleming Boat House at Wallingford alongside OUBC.

Past OULRC crews 
This is a list of OULRC crews who have raced the men's lightweight boat race against Cambridge.

(*) denotes President of the Oxford University Lightweight Rowing Club

See also

Oxford University Boat Club
Oxford University Women's Lightweight Rowing Club

References

External links
 Oxford University Lightweight Rowing Club
 Oxford University Rowing Clubs
 Henley Boat Races
 Fleming Boat House

 
Sports clubs established in 1975
1975 establishments in England
Rowing
Rowing clubs in Oxfordshire
Rowing clubs of the River Thames